Pauline Parmentier was the defending champion, but chose not to participate.

Sara Sorribes Tormo won the title, defeating Karolína Muchová in the final, 7–6(7–5), 6–4.

Seeds

Main draw

Finals

Top half

Bottom half

References 
 Main draw

Bredeney Ladies Open - Singles